Jenkin Jones may refer to:
 Jenkin Jones (captain) (1623–?), Welsh captain, Puritan cleric and preacher
 Jenkin Jones (pastor) (1700?–1742), Welsh Arminian pastor and writer
 Jenkin Lloyd Jones (1843–1918), American Unitarian minister
 Jenkin Jones (trade unionist) (1859–1929), Welsh trade unionist
 Jenkin Lloyd Jones Sr. (died 2004), owner and editor of the Tulsa Tribune

See also 
 Jenkinjones, West Virginia